NGC 4125 is an elliptical galaxy in the constellation Draco.

In 2016, the telescope KAIT discovered the super nova SN 2016coj in this galaxy. After detection it became brighter over the course of several days, with the spectrum indicating a Type Ia supernova.

References

External links
 

NGC 4125
Shell galaxies
Draco (constellation)
4125
07118
38524